Rusk County is a county  in the U.S. state of Wisconsin. As of the 2020 census, the population was 14,188. Its county seat is Ladysmith.

History
Founded in 1901, Rusk County was originally named Gates County after Milwaukee land speculator James L. Gates.  It was renamed Rusk County in 1905 after Jeremiah M. Rusk, governor of Wisconsin and the first U.S. Secretary of Agriculture. It was formed out of the northern portion of Chippewa County.

Geography

Adjacent counties
 Washburn County - northwest
 Sawyer County - north
 Price County - east
 Taylor County - southeast
 Chippewa County - south
 Barron County - west

Major highways
  U.S. Highway 8
  Highway 27 (Wisconsin)
  Highway 40 (Wisconsin)
  Highway 73 (Wisconsin)

Railroads
Canadian National
Watco

Buses
List of intercity bus stops in Wisconsin

Airport
 KRCX - Rusk County Airport serves the county and surrounding communities.

Demographics

2020 census
As of the census of 2020, the population was 14,188. The racial makeup of the county was 94.2% White, 0.5% Native American, 0.4% Asian, 0.3% Black or African American, 0.6% from other races, and 3.9% from two or more races. Ethnically, the population was 1.8% Hispanic or Latino of any race.

2000 census

As of the census of 2000, there were 15,347 people, 6,095 households, and 4,156 families residing in the county. The population density was 17 people per square mile (6/km2). There were 7,609 housing units at an average density of 8 per square mile (3/km2). The racial makeup of the county was 97.69% White, 0.51% Black or African American, 0.42% Native American, 0.26% Asian, 0.10% Pacific Islander, 0.35% from other races, and 0.66% from two or more races. 0.76% of the population were Hispanic or Latino of any race. 32.7% were of German, 13.6% Polish, 9.0% Norwegian, 6.8% Irish, 6.2% American and 5.6% English ancestry.

There were 6,095 households, out of which 28.60% had children under the age of 18 living with them, 55.90% were married couples living together, 7.90% had a female householder with no husband present, and 31.80% were non-families. 27.00% of all households were made up of individuals, and 14.30% had someone living alone who was 65 years of age or older. The average household size was 2.45 and the average family size was 2.97.

In the county, the population was spread out, with 24.80% under the age of 18, 7.90% from 18 to 24, 24.80% from 25 to 44, 24.10% from 45 to 64, and 18.50% who were 65 years of age or older. The median age was 40 years. For every 100 females there were 98.50 males. For every 100 females age 18 and over, there were 97.40 males.

In 2017, there were 134 births, giving a general fertility rate of 66.0 births per 1000 women aged 15–44, the 25th highest rate out of all 72 Wisconsin counties. Additionally, there were no reported induced abortions performed on women of Rusk County residence in 2017.

Communities

City
 Ladysmith (county seat)

Villages

 Bruce
 Conrath
 Glen Flora
 Hawkins
 Ingram
 Sheldon
 Tony
 Weyerhaeuser

Towns

 Atlanta
 Big Bend
 Big Falls
 Cedar Rapids
 Dewey
 Flambeau
 Grant
 Grow
 Hawkins
 Hubbard
 Lawrence
 Marshall
 Murry
 Richland
 Rusk
 South Fork
 Strickland
 Stubbs
 Thornapple
 True
 Washington
 Wilkinson
 Willard
 Wilson

Unincorporated communities

 Apollonia
 Bear Lake
 Imalone
 Island Lake
 Murry
 Port Arthur
 South Fork
 Strickland
 Thornapple

Ghost towns

 Atlanta
 Big Bend
 Crane
 Egypt
 Horseman (Varner)
 Jerome
 Kalish
 Mandowish (Manedowish)
 Poplar / Beldonville
 Pre Bram
 Shaws Farm
 Teresita
 Tibbets
 Vallee View / Walrath
 West Ingram
 Wilson Center / Dogville (Starez)

Politics

See also
 Flambeau Mine
 National Register of Historic Places listings in Rusk County, Wisconsin

References

Further reading
 Dresden, Katharine Woodrow. History of Rusk County, Wisconsin. Madison: University of Wisconsin, 1931.

External links

 Rusk County government website
 Rusk County map from the Wisconsin Department of Transportation
 Plat maps, 1915-1920

 
1901 establishments in Wisconsin
Populated places established in 1901